Vitor Gabriel Claudino Rego Ferreira (born 20 January 2000), commonly known as Vitor Gabriel, is a Brazilian footballer who currently plays for Campeonato Brasileiro Série B club Ceará, on loan from Flamengo.

Career

Flamengo
On 16 October 2019, Vitor Gabriel played his first Campeonato Brasileiro Série A match against Fortaleza at Castelão, he replaced Gerson on the 46th minute and netted an assist to Reinier score the winning goal, Flamengo won 2–1.

On 14 December 2022, Vitor Gabriel extended his contract for another six months until 30 June 2024 and then loaned to Ceará for the 2023 season.

Braga (loan)
On 28 January 2020, Vitor Gabriel was loaned to Portuguese club Braga through the end of 2020.

Juventude (loan)
On 4 January 2022, Juventude signed a one-year loan deal with Vitor Gabriel until 31 December 2022.

Ceará (loan)
On 14 December 2022, Vitor Gabriel signed on loan with Ceará until 31 December 2023.

Career statistics

Club

Notes

Honours

Clubs
Flamengo
Campeonato Brasileiro Série A: 2019
Campeonato Carioca: 2019

References

External links

2000 births
Living people
Brazilian footballers
Brazilian expatriate footballers
Association football forwards
Nova Iguaçu Futebol Clube players
CR Flamengo footballers
Esporte Clube Juventude players
Ceará Sporting Club players
S.C. Braga B players
Liga Portugal 2 players
Campeonato Brasileiro Série A players
Campeonato Brasileiro Série B players
Brazilian expatriate sportspeople in Portugal
Expatriate footballers in Portugal
Footballers from Rio de Janeiro (city)